Irene Foote may refer to:

 Irene Castle (1893–1969), née Foote, American ballroom dancer and dance teacher
 Irene Foote (bowls), New Zealand lawn bowls player